Magnum, P.I. is an American crime drama television series starring Tom Selleck as Thomas Magnum, a private investigator (P.I.) living on Oahu, Hawaii. The series ran from December 11, 1980 to May 8, 1988 during its first-run broadcast on the American television network CBS.  Magnum, P.I. consistently ranked in the top 20 U.S. television programs in the Nielsen ratings during the first five years of its original run in the United States, finishing as high as number three for the 1982–83 season.

A remake series of the same name was ordered to series on May 11, 2018, and premiered on September 24, 2018 on CBS.

Premise
Thomas Sullivan Magnum IV is a private investigator played by Tom Selleck. He lives in the guest house of a  beachfront estate called Robin's Nest, in Hawaii, at the invitation of its owner, Robin Masters. Masters is rarely depicted and the celebrated author of several dozen lurid novels. Ostensibly this is quid pro quo for Magnum's services based upon his expertise in security; the pilot and several early episodes suggest Magnum had done Masters a favor of some kind, possibly when Masters hired him for a case. The voice of Robin Masters, heard only in five episodes, was provided by Orson Welles (one last appearance was provided by a different actor, Red Crandell).

Magnum lives a luxurious life on the estate and operates as a P.I. on cases that suit him. The only thorn in the side of his near-perfect lifestyle is Jonathan Quayle Higgins III, played by John Hillerman. An ex-British Army regimental sergeant major, he is on the surface a stern, by-the-book caretaker of Robin's Nest, whose strict ways often conflict with Magnum's more easy-going methods. He patrols Robin's Nest with his two highly-trained "lads", Dobermans named Zeus and Apollo. Magnum has free use of the guest house and the car, a Ferrari 308 GTS Quattrovalvole, but as a humorous aside in various episodes, often has to bargain with Higgins for use of estate amenities such as the tennis courts, wine cellar and expensive cameras.

The relationship between Magnum and Higgins is initially cool, but as the series progressed, an unspoken respect and fondness of sorts grew between the pair. Many episodes dedicated more screen time to this "odd couple" pairing after the relationship proved popular with fans. A recurrent theme throughout the last two seasons, starting in the episode "Paper War", involves Magnum's sneaking suspicion that Higgins is actually Robin Masters since he opens Robin's mail, calls Robin's Ferrari "his car" etc. This suspicion is neither proved nor disproved, although in at least one episode Higgins is shown alone in a room, picking up a ringing phone and talking to Robin Masters, indicating they are two different people.

Aside from Higgins, Magnum's two main companions on the islands are Theodore "T.C." Calvin (Roger E. Mosley), who runs a one-person local helicopter charter and tour van service called "Island Hoppers", and often finds himself persuaded by Magnum to fly him during various cases, and Orville Wilbur Richard "Rick" Wright (Larry Manetti), who refuses to use his Wright brothers-esque given name of Orville and who owns a local bar. In the pilot episode, this was "Rick's Cafe Americain" in town, inspired by Casablanca, with Rick appearing in suitable 1930s attire. After completing the pilot, though, executives felt that audiences would be unable to fully connect with this element. Instead, Rick moved to running the plush, beachside King Kamehameha Club, which has exclusive membership and Higgins on the board of directors. Magnum often strolls around the club, using its facilities and running up an ever-unpaid tab, further fueling the Magnum-Higgins feud.
T.C. and Rick are both former Marines from VMO-2 with whom Magnum, a former member of the United States Navy SEALs and Naval Intelligence officer, served in the Vietnam War. The series was one of the first to deal with Vietnam veterans as "human beings" and not as shell-shocked killers, and was praised by many ex-servicemen groups for doing so. Magnum often dupes or bribes T.C. and Rick into aiding him on his cases, much to their frustration.  T.C., whose assistance often involves the use of his helicopter, frequently says to Magnum "gas money. All I need is gas money" referring to the high cost of fuel for the use of the helicopter.

Magnum comes and goes as he pleases, works only when he wants, and has the almost unlimited use of the Ferrari and many other luxuries of the estate. He keeps a mini-refrigerator with a seemingly endless supply of beer ("altbier"), wears his father's treasured Rolex GMT Master wristwatch and is surrounded by countless beautiful women, who are often victims of crime, his clients, or are connected to the cases he solves.

Other characteristics specific to Magnum are his thick moustache, baseball caps (usually a Detroit Tigers or VMO-2 cap), a rubber chicken, and a variety of colorful Aloha shirts. Nearly every episode is narrated, in voice-over, by Magnum at various points. At the end of the seventh season, Magnum was to be killed off, to end the series. Following an outcry from fans who demanded a more satisfactory conclusion, an eighth season was produced to bring Magnum "back to life" and to round off the series.

Cast

Main cast

 Tom Selleck as Thomas Magnum
 Roger E. Mosley as Theodore "T.C." Calvin
 Larry Manetti as Orville "Rick" Wright
John Hillerman as Jonathan Higgins

Recurring characters
 Lt. Yoshi Tanaka: A homicide-division police lieutenant with the Honolulu police department (played by Kwan Hi Lim), he has a slight Lieutenant Columbo-like enigmatic quality, characterized by his casual dress and ironic sense of humor. He is also, like Magnum, a Detroit Tigers fan. He appeared in Seasons 2–8.
 Agatha Chumley: Higgins' stereotypically English lady friend (played by Gillian Dobb), who seems to have a crush on Higgins. Her first appearance was in the episode "Black on White". She appeared in Seasons 3–8.
 Colonel "Buck" Greene: A Marine Corps aviator and intelligence officer (played by Lance LeGault), who is often Magnum's nemesis in seasons 2–8. LeGault also played John W. Newton, aka "Delta One" in Episode 1.9 "Missing in Action".
 Carol Baldwin: An assistant district attorney (played by Patty McCormack in season 1, followed by Kathleen Lloyd in seasons 3–8); before playing Carol Baldwin, Lloyd guest starred in the episode "Almost Home" (Season 3 - Episode 11) as Bridget Archer.
 Lieutenant "Mac" MacReynolds: A doughnut-munching Office of Naval Intelligence (ONI) lieutenant (played by Jeff MacKay), killed by a car bomb planted by "Ivan", a Russian KGB officer. Mac returns as a ghost for four episodes ("Mac's Back", "Limbo", "Infinity and Jelly Doughnuts" and "Pleasure Principle") and later as a look-alike character (see below). In the pilot, MacKay portrayed "Ski", a guard at the entrance gate of Pearl Harbor. He appeared in Seasons 1–3 and 7–8.
 Jim Bonnick: A con man and an ex-Navy pilot who was released on a medical discharge (played by Jeff MacKay); he was also Mac Reynolds' look-alike. In at least one episode ("Mac's Back"), MacKay appeared in both roles. He appeared in Seasons 5–8.
 Francis "Icepick" Hofstetler: An American loan shark and major underworld figure from Chicago, and a quasi-father figure to Rick Wright (played initially by Walter Chotzen and then by veteran actor Elisha Cook Jr.).
 Dr. Ibold, M.D. "Doc Ibold": A minor character (played by Glenn Cannon) who appeared in episodes when the script called for a physician. First referred to as "Script Writer #1", he was known for prescribing opiates for any and all ailments. He appeared in Seasons 2–8. Cannon also played Dr. Bernard Kessler in Episode 1.7, "Never Again...Never Again".
 Michelle Hue: The love of Magnum's life (played by Marta DuBois); she and Magnum married in Vietnam but the devoutly Catholic Michelle had the marriage annulled after her first husband, a North Vietnamese general who was presumed dead, resurfaced. Magnum had believed that Michelle was killed during the 1975 evacuation of Saigon. She appeared in Seasons 2–8.
Lily Catherine Hue: Daughter to Magnum and Michelle Hue (played by Kristen Carreira). Michelle entrusts Lily to Magnum's care, but doesn't reveal that she is his daughter. Although she was raised as the daughter of General Hue, Lily Catherine learned Magnum-related things from Michelle, such as "Detroit Tigers" and "Rick, T.C., Thomas". By "Resolutions" (May 1988), General Hue's enemies had killed Hue, Michelle, and Michelle's second husband, Edward Durant. Lily Catherine was presumed dead and was reunited with Magnum, who returned to his career as a Naval Intelligence officer to protect her. She appears in seasons 7-8.
 Lieutenant (later Lieutenant Commander) Maggie Poole: The successor of the deceased Mac Reynolds (played by Jean Bruce Scott), she dislikes her superior, Marine Corps Colonel Greene. She appeared in Seasons 3–8.
 Luther H. Gillis: A mock film noir St. Louis private eye with a Boston accent (played by Eugene Roche), whose deception, dissembling and disturbing capacity for violence are almost always underestimated or overlooked by Magnum. Gillis provided the narration in the five episodes in which he appeared in Seasons 4–8.
 Lt. Nolan Page: A hard-nosed, no-nonsense Honolulu Police Department lieutenant with a New York accent (played by Joe Santos), he assists Magnum on several cases.He appeared in Seasons 7-8
 Moki: The bartender of the King Kamehameha Club in Season 1; later replaced by Keoki, he appeared in Seasons 1–2.
 Keoki: The bartender/server of the King Kamehameha Club starting in season 2. He is arrested in season 4 by Lt. Tanaka for robbing the club in the episode "I Witness". He appeared in seasons 2–4.
 Bryant Calvin, T.C.'s son in seasons 7 and 8, played by Shavar Ross.

Setting

Robin's Nest is the fictional beach front estate on the island of Oahu, Hawaii, which serves as the residence of the main characters. In the series, it is owned by renowned novelist Robin Masters, who employs Jonathan Higgins as the estate's caretaker and Thomas Magnum as its security expert. Higgins resides in the estate's main house while Magnum occupies the guest house.

In reality, the  beachfront property was located on the east shore of Oahu at 41-505 Hawaii Route 72 near Waimanalo Beach, Hawaii. Called "Pahonu" ("turtle enclosure" in Hawaiian language), it was also known locally as "The Anderson Estate" after long-time owner, local politician Eve G. Anderson. The grounds had been used for hundreds of years for raising green sea turtles for the Hawaiian royal family and includes a 500-by-50-foot stone wall that surrounds the former turtle-raising pond. Since 1978, the turtle pond has been on the National Register of Historic Places listings in Hawaii. A residential estate since the early 1930s, comprising an  main house, a boathouse (which in the series appears as the guest house that Magnum occupies), a gatehouse, and private tennis court.

Owned in January 2014 by Cox Communications heiress Barbara Cox Anthony, it was placed on the market with Sotheby's for $15.75 million and sold for $8.7 million in March 2015. In April 2018, the estate was demolished.

Many of the indoor scenes of Magnum, P.I. were filmed on the old Hawaii Five-O soundstage, as the network did not wish for their Hawaiian production facilities to go to waste after Hawaii Five-O ended its run.

Through the years, fans of the show have noted commonalities in the settings of time and space (the so-called fictional TV universe) between Magnum, P.I. and Hawaii Five-O. For example, in Season 1, Episode 5: "Thank Heavens for Little Girls, and Big Ones Too", Higgins calls Five-O to report a theft. Or Season 1 Episode 6: "Skin Deep", Magnum (Tom Selleck) gets on the radio pretending he's with the police and asks: "Billy, this is McGarrett of Five-O. Is David Norman armed?" The producers of Magnum, P.I. unsuccessfully attempted to convince Jack Lord to make a cameo.

However, in a 2013 episode of the Hawaii Five-0 remake, the characters "sing" the Magnum, P.I. theme song while discussing which person most resembled the characters on that television program. The purported connection between the two programs appears to be preserved in the remakes, as explained by their creators in TV Guide, where plans for a crossover were announced as well as acknowledgement of the coexistence of Magnum with Hawaii Five-0 in the same TV universe. A Hawaii Five-0 and Magnum P.I. crossover event between Hawaii Five-0 and Magnum P.I. aired on CBS in January 2020, with the Hawaii Five-0 episode "Ihea 'oe i ka wa a ka ua e loku ana?" (which is Hawaiian for "Where were you when the rain was pouring?"), followed by the Magnum P.I. episode "Desperate Measures".

Theme music 
The original theme music for the opening credits of the pilot episode was a mid-tempo jazzy piece by Ian Freebairn-Smith. This music was also used for the next nine regular episodes.

Beginning in Episode 12, it was replaced by a more up tempo theme typical of 1980s action series by Mike Post and Pete Carpenter with guitar by Larry Carlton. This theme had been used during the show and over the closing credits from Episode 8. A longer version of this second theme ("Theme from Magnum P.I.", 3:25 in duration) credited to Post was released as a single by Elektra Records in 1982 and featured on the Billboard Hot 100 chart that same year, peaking at No. 25 on May 8, 1982. This version also appeared on Post's 1982 album Television Theme Songs.

Vehicles

Cars
Robin Masters' cars
 "ROBIN 1"
 1979 Ferrari 308 GTS (season 1)
 1981 Ferrari 308 GTSi (seasons 2–6)
 1984 Ferrari 308 GTS QuattroValvole (seasons 7–8)
 "ROBIN 2"
 1980 Audi 5000 (seasons 1–4; first copy blown up in S1E5)
 1985 Audi 5000 (seasons 5–8)
 1974 Jaguar XJ (seen only in season 4, episode 18)
 "ROBIN 3"
 1980 GMC Jimmy Siera (GMC Jimmy Siera — season 1–3)
 1983 GMC Jimmy (Chevrolet S-10 Blazer — seasons 4–6)
 1984 Jeep Wagoneer (XJ Model — seasons 7–8)
 "Robin 23"
 1981 Ferrari GTSi (green) – seen only in the 13th episode of the 6th season; "Summer School". This car was provided by Robin Masters for his visiting nephew, 'R.J.'.
 "56E-478" Non-'Robin' License Plate  
 1978 Ferrari 308 GTS (episodes' opening theme/credits) 

Others
 Island Hoppers (TC's) van — Volkswagen Type 2 (T3)
 Rick's convertible — Mercedes-Benz R107 and C107 (Col. Buck Green referred to it as a 450SL when Rick went missing) and at least one Corvette in an early episode in which Thomas and Rick drive side-by-side on a two-lane byway. Rick drove the Mercedes from the middle of Season 2 through to the end of the series.
 Rick's Datsun 280ZX — Nissan S130. Rick drove this car when the series started until the middle of season 2, after which he drove the Mercedes.
 Magnum's Beetle — 1966 Volkswagen Beetle convertible. In 1979, having just opened up his private investigator business, Magnum drove a battered blue Volkswagen Beetle convertible, with a rusted driver's side door.
 Magnum's Jaguar — 1969 Jaguar E-Type. Magnum drove the quite abused red Jaguar convertible in one Season 5 episode "Blind Justice" after Higgins cut him off from using the Ferrari.
 The Bentley — 1937 Bentley 3.5 Litre Drophead Coupe (Gurney Nutting body). When Magnum and Higgins visit England in the Season 6 opener, when Robin Masters had just bought a new estate, "Robin's Keep", Magnum drives the old Bentley, the only car included with the estate. The car was previously driven by James Bond in the unofficial 1983 movie Never Say Never Again.

Aircraft
 Island Hoppers (TC's) helicopter — MD Helicopters MD 500 (various models)
 Ken Enderlin Charters — N9267F is a Hughes Model 369HS built in 1975, Construction Number (C/N) 1150778S, in the episodes "Dream a Little Dream" and "Missing Melody".

Development and production 

Development of Magnum, P.I. was originally slated at ABC, which aired other Glen A. Larson series The Hardy Boys/Nancy Drew Mysteries (1977–1979) and Battlestar Galactica (1978–1979). In January 1979, ABC cancelled both series, and development on Magnum, P.I. Larson then took the series over to CBS.

Selleck's contract commitment to the Magnum, P.I. series famously cost him the role of Indiana Jones in the first Indiana Jones film, Raiders of the Lost Ark (1981), which went to Harrison Ford. Selleck was unable to take the part of Jones as Magnum was due to start filming in March 1980. Owing to the 1980 AFTRA/Screen Actors Guild strike, production of Magnum was delayed until December 1980, which would have allowed Selleck to play Jones.

In the 1986–87 season 7 of Magnum, P.I., Selleck was brought in as a producer and the program was moved from its Thursday night slot on CBS to Wednesday, which increased its slumping ratings from competing with The Cosby Show (1984–1992) on NBC.

Episodes

Crossovers

 "Ki'is Don't Lie" — Magnum works with the Simon brothers to recover a stolen Hawaiian artifact that's supposedly cursed. The plot concludes on Simon & Simon in the episode "Emeralds Are Not a Girl's Best Friend".
 "Novel Connection" — Jessica Fletcher comes to Hawaii when an attempt is made on the lives of Robin's guests. The plot concludes on Murder, She Wrote in the episode "Magnum on Ice".

For re-run and overseas purposes, the first half of these crossovers (the Magnum episode) also had alternate endings filmed, which wrapped the story up in a single episode and so allowed repeat showings as "stand-alone" stories rather than two-part crossovers.

One mooted crossover from later in the series' run was with the CBS vigilantism drama The Equalizer, starring Edward Woodward as the retired spy Robert McCall. According to Equalizer executive producer Coleman Luck, interviewed for a special-feature documentary on The Equalizer, the crossover was proposed by Universal Television and was opposed by the Equalizer production staff.

In 1992, three years after the conclusion of Magnum, a script was written for a potential crossover with Donald P. Bellisario's next show, NBC's Quantum Leap, in which Dr. Sam Beckett (Scott Bakula) would "leap" into the body of Thomas Magnum. It is unknown whether any original cast members from Magnum were slated to appear in the episode or how far production had progressed, though test footage does exist of the attempted recreation of Tom Selleck's famous fourth-wall breaking "eyebrow" shot from the opening credits with Bakula in the role.

Home media
Universal Pictures Home Entertainment has released all eight seasons of Magnum, P.I. on DVD in Region 1, 2 and 4. On October 1, 2013, Universal released Magnum, P.I. - The Complete Series on DVD in Region 1. The 42-disc set features all 162 episodes of the series as well as bonus features.

On December 12, 2016, in the United Kingdom, the complete series was released in HD on Blu-ray.

In Australia, Madman Entertainment has re-released all eight seasons on DVD from November 18, 2015 - June 20, 2018, followed by "The Complete Series" on October 9, 2019.

 Region 2 release dates refer to the United Kingdom market only.

* Includes the crossover Season 2 episode from Simon & Simon titled "Emeralds Are Not a Girl's Best Friend".

** Includes the crossover Season 3 episode from Murder, She Wrote titled "Magnum On Ice".

*** Includes the bonus Season 5 episode from The Rockford Files titled "White on White and Nearly Perfect" featuring Tom Selleck. 
****Includes bonus episodes from The A-Team, Season 2 titled "Diamonds 'n' Dust" and Knight Rider, Season 2, titled "Brother's Keeper".

Awards
Selleck won an Emmy in 1984 for his portrayal of the title character. Three years later, co-star John Hillerman also won an Emmy. In 1981, series creators and writers Glen A. Larson and Donald P. Bellisario received an Edgar Award from the Mystery Writers of America for Best Episode in a TV Series.

Golden Globe Awards
Magnum, P.I. was nominated for multiple Golden Globe Awards:

Primetime Emmy Awards

Other awards

Detroit Tigers incident
On September 16, 2017, a group of 45 men dressed as Thomas Magnum were ejected from a Detroit Tigers game for smoking and catcalling women in the park.
The story quickly became one of international interest as the group, from nearby Allen Park, Michigan gave dozens of interviews to newspapers, magazines, radio stations, podcasts and more.

Proposed sequels
In October 2013, Selleck said Tom Clancy had planned to write a screenplay for a Magnum, P.I. film in the 1990s, with Universal Pictures interested in producing it. The project remained unmaterialized.

In September 2016, ABC began developing a sequel from Leverage creator John Rogers and producer Eva Longoria centering on Lily "Tommy" Magnum, which never made it to series.

Remake

In October 2017, CBS announced they had issued a pilot commitment for a remake of the series, to be developed by Peter M. Lenkov, who has helped remake other series like Hawaii Five-0 and MacGyver for the network. CBS officially ordered the pilot three months later, along with one for a reboot of another hit 1980s television series for the network, Cagney & Lacey, as well as one for 1990s favorite Murphy Brown.
On February 20, 2018, actor Jay Hernandez was cast as Thomas Magnum.

Notes

References

External links

 
 
 Magnum Mania

 
1980 American television series debuts
1988 American television series endings
American action television series
1980s American crime drama television series
1980s American mystery television series
CBS original programming
American detective television series
Edgar Award-winning works
English-language television shows
Fictional portrayals of the Honolulu Police Department
Primetime Emmy Award-winning television series
Television series created by Donald P. Bellisario
Television series created by Glen A. Larson
Television series by Universal Television
Television shows filmed in Hawaii
Television shows set in Hawaii